Spring High School is a public high school located in the Spring census-designated place in unincorporated Harris County, Texas, United States.

Spring High School, which serves grades 9 through 12, is a part of the Spring Independent School District. Spring High School's mascot is the lion. School colors are black, green, and white.  Oren Chappell was principal of the school in the early 1980s. Gloria Marshall was the principal of Spring High School from 1985 until June 2007.  Dean Borg served as principal for the 2007-2008 school year and Donna Ullrich was named principal on July 3, 2008.. Diaka R. Carter was appointed as the new principal in 2016. As of the 2011-2012 school year, Spring High School is the largest campus in Spring ISD.

Spring High School was named a 1992-93 National Blue Ribbon School.

History
Spring High School opened in 1969. Spring High was built along Interstate 45 from which passing drivers could see the school. In 1976 Spring High School South opened, taking ninth graders from Spring High School. In 1981 and 1982 Spring High South renamed itself Westfield High School and became its own four-year institution. In 2000 the Richard C. Crain Fine Arts Building opened on the property of Spring High School. It was named after Richard Crain, who directed band at Spring and Westfield and became the director of music.

2013 stabbing incident

On September 4, 2013, a 17-year-old student was killed, and three other teen boys were injured during a stabbing attack at the school. Luis Alonzo Alfaro, was charged with murder. Luis admitted pulling a knife during the fight and stabbing four people.

2020s
In February 2017 the district proposed redrawing the attendance boundaries of its high schools; this would take effect in the 2020-2021 school year. The district also plans to establish one ninth grade center for each comprehensive high school. According to the proposed 2020-2021 high school map, the eastern portion of the Spring census-designated place will be reassigned from Spring High School to Dekaney High School. The school district delayed the rezoning at least until after the 2021-2022 school year due to the COVID-19 pandemic in Texas, as it determines how the pandemic changed student enrollment patterns in Spring ISD.

Campus 
In the 1990s banners about the school's achievements were posted so commuters on I-45 could view them.

The original Spring High School campus was built in 1969. In 1996, the Spring ISD Board of Trustees agreed to a 3-year 20 million dollar renovation project that included additional buildings, a new cafeteria, a new baseball field, a softball field and two new gymnasiums. In 2000 the Richard C. Crain Fine Arts Building was built to accommodate the Spring Band, Spring Choir and the Lion Players Theatre Company. In 2009 the Spring High School Performing Arts Center was built after the renovation of the original auditorium.

Academics
For the 2018-2019 school year, Spring High School received a C grade from the Texas Education Agency, with an overall score of 76 out of 100. The school received a C grade in each of the three domains: 76 in Student Achievement, 78 in School Progress, and 71 in Closing the Gaps. The school did not receive any of the seven possible distinction designations.

Student body
As of 2013, the school has about 3,500 students, making it one of the largest high schools in Harris County. As of that year, 34% of Spring High School students were Hispanic, 32% were White, and 28% were black. In 2003, the school had 2,750 students, with 68% being White, 18% Hispanic, and 12% black.

For the 2018-2019 school year, there were 2,842 students. 37.1% were African American, 2.2% were Asian, 42.2% were Hispanic, 0.7% were American Indian, 0.3% were Pacific Islander, 15.7% were White, and 1.8% were two or more races. 59.9% of students were economically disadvantaged, 8.7% were English Language Learners, and 10.6% received Special Education services.

Notable alumni
 Brooke Adams (class of 2003), Professional wrestler for Total Nonstop Action wrestling.
 Greg Baldwin (class of 1978), actor and voice actor
 Josh Beckett (class of 1999), MLB player last played for the Los Angeles Dodgers
 Crystal Bernard (class of 1979), actor and musician
 Marqui Christian (class of 2012), NFL player for the New York Jets
 Ben Gay (class of 1998) NFL player last played for the Indianapolis Colts
 Xavier Jones (class of 2015) NFL player for the Los Angeles Rams
 Bravvion Roy (class of 2016) NFL player for the Carolina Panthers

Feeder schools
The following middle schools feed into Spring High School:
Bammel Middle School 
Rickey C. Bailey Middle School
O.B. Dueitt Middle School
Springwoods Village Middle School
Twin Creeks Middle School
Dr. Edward Roberson Middle School 
Edwin M Wells Middle School
The following elementary schools feed into Spring High School:
George Anderson Elementary School 
Chet Burchett Elementary School 
Pearl M. Hirsch Elementary School 
Mildred Jenkins Elementary School
Gloria Marshall Elementary School 
Ginger McNabb Elementary School 
Northgate Crossing Elementary School 
Salyers Elementary School 
Lewis Eugene Smith Elementary School 
John A. Winship Elementary School
Clark Intermediate Elementary School
Clark Primary Elementary School

References

External links
 

 Spring High School
 Great Schools, Inc: Spring High School

Spring Independent School District high schools
Educational institutions established in 1969
1969 establishments in Texas